Grant Davies (born 13 October 1959 in Barrow) is an English former professional footballer. A centre half, Davies joined Newport County in 1978 from Preston North End. Between 1978 and 1983 Davies made 150 league appearances for Newport, scoring 1 goal during the most successful period in the club's long history. Davies was part of the team that won promotion and the Welsh Cup and in the subsequent season reached the quarter-final of the 1981 European Cup Winners Cup.

In 1983, he had a brief loan spell at Exeter City making 7 league appearances before joining Gloucester City.

References

External links

1959 births
Living people
English footballers
Preston North End F.C. players
Newport County A.F.C. players
Exeter City F.C. players
Yeovil Town F.C. players
Gloucester City A.F.C. players
English Football League players
Footballers from Barrow-in-Furness
Association football central defenders
Footballers from Cumbria